Akanu Ibiam Federal Polytechnic, Unwana is located in Unwana city, Ebonyi State, Nigeria. The polytechnic was founded in 1981 and is owned by the federal government. 
It is named after Akanu Ibiam, the First Republic Governor of Eastern Region, Nigeria. The school was initially located on the present site of Federal Government College Okposi, and moved to its site in Unwana in 1987. There are five schools that offer programs leading to National Diploma (ND) and Higher National Diploma (HND) in sciences, engineering, and humanities.

In October 2003 the polytechnic was designated a center for excellence in the southeast by the Nigeria Board for Polytechnic Education due to its excellent administration and the quality of its courses. On 16 September 2008 the school had to be temporarily closed after a violent protest that caused considerable property damage triggered by the murder of an elderly woman at the school. In October 2008 the Polytechnic was selected for establishment of a world class Information and Communication Technology center by the United Nations Education, Scientific and Cultural Organization (UNESCO). In November 2009 a new library was being constructed.

See also
List of polytechnics in Nigeria

References

 
Education in Ebonyi State
1981 establishments in Nigeria
Educational institutions established in 1981
Federal polytechnics in Nigeria
Academic libraries in Nigeria